John McLoughlin Jr. (1812–1842) was a Metis Chief Trader employed by the Hudson's Bay Company.

Early life
He was the son of longtime Chief Factor of the Columbia District John McLoughlin and Marguerite Waddens MacKay.

Fort Stikine

He was appointed to Fort Stikine though was unpopular with some of the Metis among the staff.

Murder
Several staff members killed him on 21 April 1842, in what they alleged was self-defense at his drunken rage. Hawaiian Kanaka employees who witnessed the killing were to testify otherwise. They alleged that the rebel staff, led by one Urbain Héroux, had conspired with the local Tlingits to seize the post.

The usual laws governing the Company and its staff were those of the Colony of Canada. However, because the murder had happened on ostensibly Russian soil, these laws did not apply in this case. George Simpson arrived five days after the murder and held a short investigation. He found the murder "justifiable homicide", and took Heroux and the others to the Russian American capital of Novoarkhangelsk for trial. While still at Novoarkhangelsk Simpson was surprised to encounter Heroux at liberty on the streets. Unlike British colonial law, the accused were free until convicted under Russian law. They were ultimately not prosecuted by Governor of Russian Colonies in America Ferdinand von Wrangel and released by the spring of 1844 for lack of evidence.

The official handling of John Jr.'s death was a major factor in embittering his father against Simpson and the HBC:"But the hastiness of the Sitka investigation, Simspon's unqualified condemnation of Fort Stikine as a "sink of corruption:, and his refusal to punish the son's murderers as McLoughlin demanded, or even send them to Canada for trial were facts which the father never forgave."

Legacy
His body was interred at Fort Vancouver on 12 October 1843.

Author Debra Komar wrote an investigative history into the death of McLoughlin Jr. named The Bastard of Fort Stikine (Goose Lane Editions 2015). In it, Komar uses both forensic science and historical research to create a narrative of both Fort Stikine and the Canadian North.

Citations

Bibliography

 
 

Canadian fur traders
Canadian people of Anglo-Irish descent
French Quebecers
1812 births
1842 deaths
Hudson's Bay Company people
Oregon pioneers